Diegoaelurus ("San Diego's cat") is an extinct genus of placental mammals from extinct subfamily Machaeroidinae within extinct family Oxyaenidae. This genus currently contains only one species Diegoaelurus vanvalkenburghae, found in the Santiago Formation in California. This mammal lived during the Uintan stage of the Middle Eocene Epoch around 46.2 to 39.7 million years ago.

Etymology
Diegoaelurus vanvalkenburghae was named after Dr. Blaire Van Valkenburgh in honor of her research on carnivorous mammals and saber-toothed predator paleoecology.

Description

Diegoaelurus vanvalkenburghae was small in stature, with a size comparable to a fossa. The holotype fossils (SDSNH 38343) consists of a mandible and well preserved dentition. Its discovery has made paleontologists question whether this group's extinction was caused due to the large faunal turnover at the end of the Eocene. This creature as well as its subfamily were some of the first predatory saber toothed mammals to have evolved, 30 million years before the Machairodontinae (saber-toothed cats) evolved in the Miocene. Due to the lack of remains, there is questioning to these animals ecological niches. However, there are good remains from Machaeroides eothen which support a hypercarnivorus lifestyle for the group. D. vanvalkenburghae is actually the oldest member of its subfamily.

Discovery
The holotype fossils were discovered in Oceanside, San Diego county by paleontologist Brad Riney in 1988. The fossils were housed for over three decades in a museum until 2022 when the fossils were described and recognised as a new genus and species. This creature is so far the only North American species of Machaeroidinae known outside of Utah and Wyoming. According to a paper on the creature, ''The present study highlights how poorly documented the machaeroidine fossil record remains''.

Extinction

Diegoaelurus along with all the members of its subfamily went extinct at the end of the Eocene. A supported theory is that these mammals went extinct during the Eocene-Oligocene extinction event; A large faunal turnover at the end of the epoch was probably caused by climate change, like the freezing of Antarctica disrupting ocean currents and global temperature. Many of the primitive mammals like the Palaeotheriidae, Xiphodontidae, Dichobunidae and the Adapidae were replaced by more advanced mammals like the Rhinocerotidae (true rhinos), Castoridae (beavers) Oreodonts, and other more advanced Artiodacytyls as well as the Erinaceids (hedgehogs). It seems once the Oxyaenids went extinct their ecological nice was filled in by the Nimravids, a family of saber-toothed mammals that belonged to the group Feliformia.

Phylogeny
The phylogenetic relationships of genus Diegoaelurus are shown in the following cladogram.

See also
 Mammal classification
 Machaeroidinae

References

Fossil taxa described in 2022
Oxyaenidae
Prehistoric placental genera